Anthony McIntyre (born 27 June 1957) is a former Provisional Irish Republican Army volunteer, writer and historian. He was imprisoned for murder for 18 years in Long Kesh, spending four of those years on the no-wash protest. After his release from prison in 1992 he completed a PhD in political science at Queen's University Belfast and left the Republican Movement in 1998 to work as a journalist and researcher. A collection of his journalism was published as a book in 2008, Good Friday: The Death of Irish Republicanism.

Research and the Belfast Project

McIntyre was involved with the Boston College oral history project on the Troubles entitled the Belfast Project, conducting interviews with former Provisional IRA members who (like himself) had become disillusioned with the direction the republican movement had taken, such as Brendan Hughes and Dolours Price, and former Ulster loyalist paramilitaries such as David Ervine. The interviews were the basis for the book Voices From The Grave: Two Men's War in Ireland by Ed Moloney.

In 2011, McIntyre became embroiled in controversy when transcripts of the interviews, held by Boston College, were subpoenaed by the Police Service of Northern Ireland (PSNI) in relation to an investigation of the 1972 abduction and killing of Jean McConville. In March 2014, the PSNI announced that it was seeking to question McIntyre over newly released Belfast Project recordings, specifically in reference to the alleged role of Gerry Adams in the kidnapping and murder of Jean McConville.

Political views

McIntyre is a prominent critic of modern-day Sinn Féin and its leadership. McIntyre has spoken at Republican Sinn Féin party events. He is a co-founder of The Blanket, a journal which casts a critical eye on the Northern Ireland peace process.

References

External links
Official Blog: The Pensive Quill

1957 births
Living people
Paramilitaries from Belfast
Provisional Irish Republican Army members
People convicted of murder by Northern Ireland